The Bangladesh Secretariat, also known as Bangladesh Sachibalaya or Old Secretariat, is the administrative headquarters of the Government of Bangladesh, and houses the majority of ministries and government agencies and bodies. The secretariat can refer to the complex of ministries, or refer to the Bangladesh Civil Service central administration. Its political heads are the ministers while the administrative heads are the Secretaries to the Government. It is located in Bangladesh's capital city of Dhaka. The Secretariat complex was originally constructed as Secretariat of East Pakistan.

History
The Daily Star reported on 15 July 2009 that the Bangladesh Secretariat was filled with lobbyists who were interfering with the duties of ministers and secretaries. Despite Prime Minister Sheikh Hasina calling for end to lobbying at the secretariat. The Bangladesh Secretariat received 1200 visitors a day. 

On 9 May 2015, the ICT Division started providing free WiFi at their Bangladesh Secretariat.

The Cabinet Division declared Bangladesh Secretariat a smoke free zone on 24 October 2017.

Mohammed Nasim, the Minister of Health and Family Welfare, got stuck in a lift at the Bangladesh Secretariat for 23 minutes on 10 October 2016. It was a new lift that had been installed only for his usage.

On 7 July 2019, there was a fire at the Bangladesh Secretariat. The fire originated from the seventh floor of building six.

In March 2020, the Bangladesh Secretariat announced new restrictions on entrance due to the COVID-19 pandemic in Bangladesh. On 1 June 2020, the government announced that only 25 percent of the officials of Bangladesh Secretariat will work there physically while the about the same will work from home due to the pandemic.

Rozina Islam, a journalist of the daily Prothom Alo, was confined at the Bangladesh Secretariat for five hours and had her mobile phones seized after she went there to report on the Health Ministry on 17 April 2021. She was harassed and assaulted during her detention at the secretariat. After which Sibbir Ahmed Osmani, Deputy Secretary of the Health Ministry, filed a case against her under the Official Secrets Act of 1923. A subsequent press conference by the Ministry of Health in the Bangladesh Secretariat was boycotted by journalists following a decision of the Bangladesh Secretariat Reporters' Forum.

Proposal for a new Secretariat
A new Secretariat in Sher-e-Bangla Nagar has been purported for many years by the government to bring the secretariat closer to the Prime Minister's Office (PMO). The new building is being considered to take full account of the designs of the Jatiya Sangsad Bhaban building, made by world famous architect Louis Kahn. A committee to suggest alternatives to the current building has been set up by the Prime Minister Sheikh Hasina. Four nine-storied buildings with 14-storey foundation will be constructed on 32 acres of land.

Structure and Departments

References

Buildings and structures in Dhaka
Government buildings in Bangladesh